Capricorn Mountain is one of the several volcanic peaks of the Mount Meager massif in southwestern British Columbia, Canada. The slopes of Capricorn Mountain appear to be more gentle than other volcanic peaks of the massif. The mountain consists of a boomerang-shaped ridge, with one summit on each end of the boomerang and the main summit in the centre.

See also
List of volcanoes in Canada
Cascade Volcanoes
Garibaldi Volcanic Belt
Volcanism of Canada
Volcanism of Western Canada

References

Volcanoes of British Columbia
Two-thousanders of British Columbia
Stratovolcanoes of Canada
Mount Meager massif
Pleistocene stratovolcanoes